In applied mathematics, mode shapes are a manifestation of eigenvectors which describe the relative displacement of two or more elements in a mechanical system  or wave front.
A mode shape is a deflection pattern related to a particular natural frequency and represents the relative displacement of all parts of a structure for that particular mode.

See also
Normal mode
Harmonic oscillator

References

Linear algebra
Vectors (mathematics and physics)